The 2001 Thurrock Council election took place on 7 June 2001 to elect members of Thurrock Council in Essex, England. The election took place at the same time as the 2001 general election after being postponed from the first week of May due to an outbreak of foot-and-mouth disease. One third of the council was up for election and the Labour party stayed in overall control of the council.

Among the candidates in the election was Pauline Campbell who stood as an independent candidate after resigning from the Conservatives. Campbell, who was disabled and used a wheelchair, said that she had been first told she was the Conservative candidate but then told that she could not stand as she would not be able to canvass. However the Conservatives denied this and said that they just wanted to give someone else a chance.

After the election, the composition of the council was
Labour 37
Conservative 10
Independent 2

Election result

Ward results

References

2001
2001 English local elections
June 2001 events in the United Kingdom